A Strange Role (also known as Improperly Dressed and released in the US as Strange Masquerade) is a 1976 Hungarian drama film directed by Pál Sándor. It was entered into the 27th Berlin International Film Festival where it won the Silver Bear. The film was also selected as the Hungarian entry for the Best Foreign Language Film at the 50th Academy Awards, but was not accepted as a nominee.

Plot
The film is about a young Hungarian Communist man, who ends up hiding from the country's White Russian oppressors in remote sanatorium, disguised as a woman in 1919.

Cast
 Margit Dajka - Öreg primadonna
 Irma Patkós - Kegyelmes Asszony
 Carla Romanelli - Olasznő
 Dezső Garas - Reményi / Glück úr / Fényképész
 Sándor Szabó - Wallach doktor
 Endre Holmann - Galambos Sarolta / Kövesi János (as Holman Endre)
 Hédi Temessy - Ágota kisasszony
 Ildikó Pécsi - Mesternő
 Mária Lázár - Füsthajú nő
 Ági Margittay - Ambrusné (as Margitai Ági)
 Erzsébet Kútvölgyi - Zsófi nővér
 András Kern - Ács István
 György Simon - Lajos bácsi
 Georgiana Tarjan - Reményi Margitka (as Györgyi Tarján)
 Márk Zala - Különítményes tiszt

See also
 List of submissions to the 50th Academy Awards for Best Foreign Language Film
 List of Hungarian submissions for the Academy Award for Best Foreign Language Film

References

External links

1976 films
1970s Hungarian-language films
1976 drama films
Films directed by Pál Sándor
Hungarian drama films